Laura Ann Liswood (born March 8, 1950) is Secretary General of the Council of Women World Leaders, which is composed of 72 women presidents, prime ministers, and heads of government. It is the only organization in the world dedicated to women heads of state and government. In August 1996, she co-founded the Council with President Vigdís Finnbogadóttir of Iceland.

The work of the Council expands the understanding of leadership, establishes a network of resources for high-level women leaders, and provides a forum for the group to provide input and shape international issues important to all people. The Council's mission is to promote good governance and enhance the experience of democracy globally by increasing the number, effectiveness, and visibility of women who led at the highest levels in their countries. The Council is an affiliate of the United Nations Foundation and is currently chaired by President Dalia Grybauskaitė of Lithuania.

From 1992-1996, as director of the Women's Leadership Project, Liswood identified global leadership contributions by women heads of state. She interviewed 15 current and former women presidents and prime ministers, which is chronicled in her book and video documentary, Women World Leaders (1996, 2007 and 2009, HarperCollins). Her quest was to find out what it would take for a woman to become President of the United States.

In 1997, Liswood co-founded The White House Project, which is dedicated to electing a woman to political office. Her work with women presidents and prime ministers was the inspiration for the Project, which seeks to change the cultural message in the United States about women as leaders.

In 2001, Liswood was named Managing Director, Global Leadership and Diversity for Goldman Sachs, a premier global investment bank. Then from 2002 to 2015, Liswood held the position of Senior Advisor at Goldman Sachs, a global investment bank.

Professional background 
Liswood's professional experience includes CEO/President of the American Society for Training and Development (ASTD), executive-level consulting at the Boston Consulting Group to Fortune 500 and international companies, and executive positions at Rainier National Bank and at Group W Cable, a subsidiary of Westinghouse Broadcasting and Cable. She received the Westinghouse Award of Excellence for her contributions to women and minorities in the workplace. She has held management positions in the airline industry, including general manager for Pacific Northwest and for TWA.

Publications 
Liswood is the author of Serving Them Right (Harper Business 1991).

Liswood's latest book, The Loudest Duck, is a business guide that explores workplace diversity and uses practical stories to offer an alternate, nuanced approach to diversity to create a truly effective workplace for all (Wiley & Sons, November 2009).

Experience 
Liswood, a nationally recognized speaker, author, and advisor, has contributed to leadership and diversity in the women's community for more than 20 years as a member of the International Women's Forum, Leadership America, the board of the First Women's Bank of California, and the Washington Women's Political Caucus.

Former commissioner of the City of Seattle's Women's Commission, Liswood was the owner/publisher of Seattle Woman and is the founder of May's List, a bipartisan political donor network emphasizing women's leadership in the political arena. In 2000, the U.S. Secretary of Defense appointed her to a three-year term on the Defense Advisory Committee on Women in the Services (DACOWITS). After the events of September 11, 2001, Liswood joined the Washington, D.C. Metropolitan Police Department reserve police force, and recently retired as a Sergeant.

Education 
Liswood holds a B.A. from California State University, San Diego, a J.D. from the University of California, Davis School of Law, and an M.B.A. (1976) from Harvard Business School, She is admitted to practice law in California and Massachusetts.

References

External links 
 Laura Liswood official website
 Council of Women World Leaders at the Aspen Institute

1950 births
Living people
Boston Consulting Group people
Harvard Business School alumni
San Diego State University alumni
UC Davis School of Law alumni
University of California, Davis alumni